, known in earlier English versions as Adolf, is a manga series made by Osamu Tezuka. The story is set before, during, and after World War II and is centered on three men with the name Adolf. Adolf Kamil is an Ashkenazi Jew living in Japan. His best friend Adolf Kaufmann is of both Japanese and German descent. The third Adolf is Adolf Hitler, the dictator of Germany. Adolf also features Sohei Toge, a Japanese reporter, and his quest for documents that could turn the tide of the war. The work explores the themes of nationality, ethnicity, racism, and war, and includes elements of coming of age, spy fiction, and historical drama.

Vertical, Inc. currently publishes the series in English with Kumar Sivasubramanian as the translator, and Viz Media formerly published the series in English. It is considered the last completed serialized work of Tezuka's career.

Plot 
The story of Adolf begins in 1936 as Japanese reporter Sohei Toge travels to Berlin to cover the Berlin Olympic Games. Upon arriving, he finds that his younger brother, who has been studying in Germany as an international student, has been murdered and had connections with Communist organisations. Furthermore, all traces of information regarding his younger brother's study in Germany has vanished. Investigating the matter, he later learns that his brother's murder is connected to documents he mailed to Japan with information regarding Adolf Hitler. This information is crucial to the Third Reich as it contains proof that Adolf Hitler has Jewish blood.

Wolfgang Kaufmann, a Nazi Party expatriate living in Japan, is ordered to find the documents. He expects his son, Japanese-German Adolf Kaufmann, to become a staunch supporter of Adolf Hitler and the German Reich. However, Adolf Kaufmann is reluctant to follow his father's wishes, as his best friend Adolf Kamil is the son of German Jews. Wolfgang dies after complications regarding a search for the aforementioned document: with his dying breath, he forces Adolf Kaufmann (hereafter referred to as Kauffman) to go to Germany in order to join the Hitler Youth. While at the Hitler Youth academy, Kaufmann witnesses Kamil's father brought to execution after he comes to Europe to try and bring Jews to Japan through Shanghai. Kaufmann is forced to execute Kamil's father with a pistol as a loyalty test. As Kaufmann becomes more and more indoctrinated, in contrast his mother Yukie becomes more distant from her late husband's German ties. A test to Kaufmann's loyalty to the Reich comes when he falls in love with a German Jewish-Chinese girl, Eliza. He successfully smuggles her to his friend Kamil in Japan, but is unable to get her family to go. A year later, Japan invades China and begins the Second Sino-Japanese War, ushering in a period of fevered militarism and nationalism in Japan. During this time, Kamil becomes the confidant of one of his teachers, Ms. Ogi, who is involved in the Japanese anti-war movement.

As events progress, the lives of the three Adolfs intertwine and become more and more tangled as Sohei Toge searches for his brother's murderer. After being tortured by the Gestapo, Toge eventually tracks down his brother's girlfriend, who is revealed to be a spy working for her father, inspector Lampe. He confronts her in anger, and she confesses to reporting Isao to the SS. After a scuffle, he rapes her and leaves for Japan. Shortly afterwards, she commits suicide. In Japan, Toge quickly becomes a target for both the Kenpeitai and the German secret police, who routinely chase him down and beat him in an attempt to find the documents. Despite this, he links up with Ogi, and manages to recover the documents his brother sent to Kobe before he died. The documents change locations many times as Toge is unable to find a job due to his status as a suspect. During one of these pursuits, he makes friends with a Japanese police chief, who accompanies him on a chase to an island where Ogi is keeping the documents. However, a Gestapo team under Lampe, who is seeking revenge for his daughter, tracks him down there. Toge manages to evade Lampe after a heated firefight on the island. Though the chief is killed, a memo he wrote earlier absolves Toge of wrongdoing, and the Japanese police stop chasing him. To avoid further trouble, the documents are passed to Ogi and then to Kamil, who is now living with Eliza. In 1941 with the German invasion of the Soviet Union, Toge decides that the documents would be best in the hands of Honda, an Imperial Army general's son working for the Soviet spy ring under Richard Sorge. Before Honda can send the documents to the Soviets, Sorge is captured and the spy ring collapses. Before Honda is executed by his father after confessing to treason, he manages to bury the documents.

In the years leading up to 1945, Kaufmann ascends the hierarchy of the Nazi Party and completes his indoctrination as a Nazi. He eventually becomes a loyal subordinate of Hitler and a coordinator of death marches as an SS official. In the fallout of the 20 July Plot and Germany on the brink of military defeat under an increasingly unstable Fuhrer, he is sent to Japan by a surviving Lampe to complete his father Wolfgang's mission. Upon arrival, he is surprised to find his target, Toge, married to his mother. He also meets with Kamil, who he is angered to find has become engaged to Eliza. He later traps Eliza and rapes her, and eventually beats Kamil who comes for revenge. During his alienation of his family and friends in Japan, he is disowned by Yukie, who shortly thereafter suffers brain damage during the Allied air raid of Kobe. Kaufmann's continued investigation eventually leads to the buried documents, which he discovers only after Hitler's death renders his entire mission pointless.

Kaufmann and Kamil later meet during the Israeli-Lebanese conflict in the 1960s, which sees countless atrocities on both sides. Kaufmann, who has joined the Lebanese PLO after being constantly chased down by Israeli Nazi hunters, arrives home one day to see his Muslim wife and daughter murdered by Kamil's division. He begins a vendetta against Kamil, and challenges him to a duel. Kamil arrives and reveals his knowledge of his father's execution, and after a firefight, gains his revenge by gunning down Kaufmann.

In the 1980s, Toge arrives in Israel to visit Kamil's surviving family after he is killed in a terrorist bombing attack. He resolves to write a book called "Message to Adolf", recounting the stories of the three Adolfs, and what the concept of "justice" can lead to.

Characters 
: A Japanese reporter sent to Germany to cover the 1936 Olympics only to find his younger brother murdered. He then proceeds to investigate who killed his brother and why, leading him into a dangerous web of espionage during World War II. He was born and raised in Niihari, Ibaraki (now Tsuchiura).
: A Japanese international student studying in Germany and a member of the Communist movement in Germany. When his organisation discovers a shocking secret, he is brutally murdered.
Acetylene Lampe: A member of the Nazi Party and the Far East Chief of German Intelligence who pursues Toge around the world both to get the documents and kill him for revenge.
Rosa Lampe: Acetylene's daughter and a Gestapo informant. Reports Isao, resulting in his death, and later Sohei which results in his torture. Commits suicide after Sohei leaves Germany.
: A Japanese police chief who takes Toge's side, and lets him stay at his place. Is killed in a shootout with the Gestapo.
: The chief's daughter, who falls in love with Yoshio. Later moves to run a bar with Okei, after Honda's death. 
: A widow who wears Yakuza tattoos. Falls in love with Toge and shelters him during a pursuit by the secret police.
: A geisha who was secretly working for the Communists. Murdered by Kaufmann when they were involved in a tryst during the Gestapo's search for the documents.
: Sachi's brother, an Imperial Army officer. Loves Yukie and pulls favors for her, including guaranteeing Toge which prevents him from being tortured to death in the beginning of the story. He kills himself after his high position in the Army makes war crimes accusations likely. 
: Honda's son. After living in Manchukuo and seeing Japanese oppression firsthand, becomes part of Sorge's spy network. Admires his disgraced aunt's motives, and later becomes friends with Toge and Kamil. Falls in love with Mieko, but is killed by his father after revealing that he is a spy. His father conceals his death as a suicide.
: A half-Japanese, half-German boy living in Kobe. Though he opposes the Nazis at first, he develops a hatred for the Jews during his stay in Germany and persecutes them fervently, only renouncing these views at the end of his life. He later joins the Sicherheitsdienst, then Gestapo, then the PLO. He is killed by Kamil, in revenge for the murder of his father.
: Adolf Kaufmann's father and a strong follower of Adolf Hitler. He works for the German Consulate General in Kobe.
: Wolfgang's wife and mother to Adolf. She is unaware of what her husband is doing for the Nazi Party. Later renounces her German citizenship and marries Toge. Dies of injuries sustained during the Kobe bombings, but births their daughter before passing.
: A Jewish-German boy who considers himself Japanese, and who accidentally learns the secret behind Adolf Hitler's ancestry. He joins Toge's group during the struggle for control of the document, and emigrates to Israel with his wife after the war, joining the Israeli army. 
: Also known as Ms. Ogi. Kamil's elementary school teacher who is later marked as Communist for writing anti-war poems. Helps Kamil hide the documents. 
: A Jewish-Chinese girl living in Germany. She escapes Germany with the help of Kaufmann, but eventually marries Kamil. 
Isaac Kamil: Adolf Kamil's father and a Jewish man who seeks to actively help other Jews around the world. He is murdered by Adolf Kaufmann while in Germany.
Adolf Hitler: The German dictator himself. Many liberties are taken for the sake of plot, especially concerning his death. 
Richard Sorge: The German communist spy in charge of Soviet espionage in Japan. He plays a prominent role towards the end of the story.

Awards 
Adolf won the Kodansha Manga Award in 1986 for general manga.

Publications 

Adolf was published in English by Cadence Books and VIZ Media. The English manga is flipped to read left to right to conform to Western practice. The newer two volume release of Adolf from Vertical, Inc. is also flipped and is published under the title Message to Adolf. The manga has also been published in Brazil by Conrad Editora, in France by Tonkam, in Germany by Carlsen Verlag, in Italy by Hazard, in Spain by Planeta DeAgostini, in the Netherlands by Xtra and in Poland by Waneko.

Volumes
Volumes of English translations, in order:
 Adolf: A Tale of the Twentieth Century
 Adolf: An Exile in Japan
 Adolf: The Half-Aryan
 Adolf: Days of Infamy
 Adolf: 1945 and All That Remains

See also 

List of Osamu Tezuka manga
Osamu Tezuka's Star System
History of the Jews in Kobe

References

External links 
 Adolf manga at TezukaOsamu@World 
 
 The Comics Get Serious review of the English release of Adolf at RationalMagic.com

1983 manga
Cultural depictions of Adolf Hitler
Bungeishunjū manga
Historical anime and manga
Osamu Tezuka characters
Osamu Tezuka manga
Political thriller anime and manga
Seinen manga
Vertical (publisher) titles
Viz Media manga
Winner of Kodansha Manga Award (General)
Gekiga
Gekiga by Osamu Tezuka
Fiction set in 1936
Fiction set in 1937
Fiction set in 1941
Fiction set in 1944
Fiction set in 1945
Fiction set in the 1960s